DeNasha Stallworth (born May 5, 1992) is a professional basketball player who briefly played in the WNBA.

College
Stallworth spent two years at University of Kentucky and two years at University of California, Berkeley.

College statistics
Source

Personal life
Stallworth's parents both played college basketball. She graduated from University of Kentucky with degrees in family sciences and African-American studies.

References

External links
Denesha Stallworth Basketball Player Profile, Universitario de Ferrol, Kentucky, News, LFB stats, Career, Game Logs, Bests, Awards – eurobasket.com
DeNasha Stallworth 2009 High School Girls Basketball Profile – ESPN

1992 births
Living people
African-American basketball players
American women's basketball players
Basketball players from San Francisco
California Golden Bears women's basketball players
Connecticut Sun draft picks
Forwards (basketball)
Kentucky Wildcats women's basketball players
McDonald's High School All-Americans
South East Queensland Stars players
21st-century African-American sportspeople
21st-century African-American women